This is a partial list of songs introduced by Frank Sinatra.
 1941 – "Oh! Look at Me Now" (music by Joe Bushkin, words by John DeVries, performed with the Tommy Dorsey Orchestra).
 "This Love of Mine" (music by Sol Parker, lyrics by Frank Sinatra and Hank Sanicola, re-recorded in 1957 for In The Wee Small Hours.
 1945 – "I Fall In Love Too Easily" (music by Jule Styne, words by Sammy Cahn) Introduced in the film Anchors Aweigh.
 1949 – "The Right Girl for Me" (music by Roger Edens, words by Betty Comden and Adolph Green) Introduced in the film Take Me Out to the Ball Game.
 1954 – "Three Coins in the Fountain" (music by Jule Styne, words by Sammy Cahn) Introduced in the film Three Coins in the Fountain.
 1955 – "The Tender Trap" (music by Jimmy Van Heusen, words by Sammy Cahn) Introduced in the film The Tender Trap.
 "Love and Marriage" (music by Jimmy Van Heusen, words by Sammy Cahn) Introduced in the television film Our Town.
 "In the Wee Small Hours of the Morning" (music by David Mann, lyrics by Bob Hilliard)  – From the album In the Wee Small Hours.
 1956 – From the film High Society – "Mind if I Make Love to You?" (by Cole Porter), "Who Wants to Be a Millionaire?" (by Cole Porter), "You're Sensational" (by Cole Porter).
 1957 – "All the Way" (music by Jimmy Van Heusen, words by Sammy Cahn) introduced in the film The Joker Is Wild.
 From the album A Jolly Christmas from Frank Sinatra – "Mistletoe and Holly" (music by  Doc Stanford, lyrics by Hank Sanicola and Frank Sinatra).
 1959 – "High Hopes" (music by Jimmy Van Heusen, words by Sammy Cahn) introduced with Eddie Hodges in the film A Hole in the Head.

 
Sinatra, Frank